Casey Garnett Vincent (born 17 March 1979 in Boronia, Victoria) is a retired Australian sprinter who specialised in the 400 metres. He represented his country at two Olympic Games, in 2000 and 2004, reaching the semifinals on the first occasion.

Competition record

Personal bests
Outdoor
200 metres – 21.14 (+1.2 m/s) (Darwin 2000)
400 metres – 45.30 (Melbourne 2004)
Indoor
400 metres – 47.15 (Maebashi 1999)

References

1979 births
Living people
Athletes from Melbourne
Sportsmen from Victoria (Australia)
Australian male sprinters
Athletes (track and field) at the 1998 Commonwealth Games
Athletes (track and field) at the 2000 Summer Olympics
Athletes (track and field) at the 2004 Summer Olympics
Olympic athletes of Australia
Commonwealth Games competitors for Australia
People from Boronia, Victoria